Brian Zbydniewski (/Zeb-ah-new-ski/; born September 15, 1981) is a quarterbacks coach and former professional American football quarterback. Zbydniewski played college football at Belhaven University. During his collegiate career, Zbydniewski set numerous single-game, season, and career passing records.  Zbydniewski was inducted into Belhaven's Athletics Hall of Fame in 2022.

Early life 

Zbydniewski was born in Beaufort, South Carolina, the son of Brian and Janet Zbydniewski. He has two sisters and two brothers. He was raised Christian, and is of Polish (father) descent. Zbydniewski has mentioned Kurt Warner as one of his inspirations. Zbydniewski attended Choctawhatchee High School in Fort Walton Beach, Florida.  Zbydniewski excelled as a student athlete and played football, basketball, and baseball.

College career 
Zbydniewski graduated from Belhaven University with a degree in Business Administration, and was a starting quarterback for the Belhaven Blazers football team.

Zbydniewski set or tied single-game, season, and career records during his years with the Blazers at Belhaven. He earned numerous awards including All-Time All American, Offensive Player of the Year, Total Offense Champion, Pre-Season "Super Six", First-Team Mid-South Conference Offensive Player, Second-Team All American and was nominated alongside Eli Manning and Rod Davis for the Conerly Trophy Award in 2003 after completing 311 passes for 3,888 yards.

Zbydniewski led the nation in passing and total yards in 2003, throwing for 3,888 yards and completing 65% of passes. Currently ranks fourth all time in single-season passing yards per game.

Prior to receiving an athletic scholarship to attend Belhaven University, Zbydniewski attended East Central Community College. During his freshman year at East Central, he was invited to participate in the Mississippi Junior College All-Star game.

Professional career

(2005–2009) 
Zbydniewski began his professional career with the South Georgia Wildcats of the af2. In 2006, Zbydniewski joined the expansion Spokane Shock. In 2007, he was a member of the Manchester Wolves. In 2009, he played with the Quad City Steamwheelers.

Spokane Shock 
He completed 5-of-12 passes for 119 yards and two touchdowns as a rookie with the Shock and was a part of the ArenaBowl XXIII World Championship team.

Tampa Bay Storm 

Passed for 2,825 yards and 56 touchdowns in 11 games with the Tampa Bay Storm. Earned Offensive Player of the Week after completing eight touchdowns for 372 yards.

New Orleans VooDoo 
Saw action in four games for the New Orleans VooDoo, |url completing 4-of-13 passes for 65 yards, one touchdown and two interceptions.

Cleveland Gladiators 
In 2013, Zbydniewski completed 178-of-310 passes for 2,001 yards and 34 touchdowns in nine games with the Cleveland Gladiators. Earned Offensive Player of the Week after completing 24-of-33 passes for 316 yards and eight touchdowns in Cleveland's 64-57 overtime victory.  Zbydniewski completed 72.7 percent of his passes in the contest. He also rushed for a score for the third time in four games.

Zbydniewski spent the first part of the 2014 season in rehab for a clavicle fracture.

Spokane Shock 
Completed 106-of-183 passes for 1,251 yards and 17 touchdowns in seven games with the Spokane Shock.  The Spokane Shock acquired Zbydniewski in a trade from the Cleveland Gladiators on May 20, 2014.

Los Angeles KISS 
On March 3, 2015, Zbydniewski was assigned to the Los Angeles KISS. He started for the KISS during their Week 5 game against the Arizona Rattlers, after starting quarterback Adrian McPherson, was placed on injured reserve. Zbydinewski suffered an upper-body injury in the game's final minutes. He was placed on recallable reassignment on April 28, 2015.

Orlando Predators 
On May 6, 2015, Zbydniewski was assigned to the Orlando Predators.

AFL statistics 

Stats from ArenaFan:

Personal 
Zbydniewski married his college sweetheart Tiffany Campbell on July 2017 in Palm Beach, Florida.  Campbell is a professional actress and philanthropist.  The couple have a dog named Coconut. Zbydniewski is often known by his nickname "Zeb" acquired from teammates and fans.

Coaching career 
In 2015, Zbydniewski retired as a player and pursued coaching.  He is a recruiting assistant, scouting high school students nationwide, and is the founder of Zeb's Field Pass.

References

External links 

Arena Football League profile
ArenaFan.com profile

 

1981 births
Living people
East Central Warriors football players
Belhaven Blazers football players
South Georgia Wildcats players
Spokane Shock players
Manchester Wolves players
Quad City Steamwheelers players
Tampa Bay Storm players
New Orleans VooDoo players
Cleveland Gladiators players
Los Angeles Kiss players
Orlando Predators players
Players of American football from South Dakota
Sportspeople from Beaufort, South Carolina